Devin Harper (born May 13, 1998) is an American football linebacker for the Dallas Cowboys of the National Football League (NFL). He played college football at Oklahoma State.

High school career
Harper played on both sides of the ball throughout his high school career. He averaged 213 all-purpose yards his senior year. He was also an All-region and All-state selection. Harper also played basketball. In his senior year, he led Karns to the sectional round of the District 3-A Playoffs. He would receive District 3-A Player of the year as well as an All-Region selection.

College career
Harper played his entire collegiate career with Oklahoma State. In his freshman season he played minimally on defense, mostly playing on special teams. He played in all 13 games, recording 44 total tackles, 5 tackles for loss, 2.5 sacks, and an interception returned for a touchdown. Harper would play through a painful junior year, wearing a cast half the season and only starting in one game but playing in 10. Harper amassed 34 total tackles, 5 tackles for loss and 3 sacks. In his senior season, he started only 1 game out of 11 played and would get 37 total tackles, 5.5 tackles for loss, 2 sacks and an interception. Harper was also an All-Big 12 academic honoree. Harper's fifth season would be his best by far: He was a full-time starter along with being voted a team captain. He finished the season as the team's second-leading tackler, with 96 total. He also had 6 sacks along with 10 tackles for loss. In the 2021 Bedlam matchup against Oklahoma, he would be a key part in shutting down their offense. Against Oklahoma, he had a career-high 10 tackles, along with 7 solo stops, and with less than 2 minutes left in the game, he would shut down Oklahoma's quarterback, Caleb Williams, getting a forced throwaway, and sacked him for a 5-yard loss, helping the Cowboys defeat the Sooners 37 to 33.

Professional career

Harper was selected by the Dallas Cowboys in the sixth round, 193rd overall, of the 2022 NFL Draft. He was placed on injured reserve on October 29, 2022.

Personal life
Harper was born to his parents Kevin and Alacia. He is the older brother of Notre Dame Safety, Thomas Harper.

References

External links
 Dallas Cowboys bio
 Oklahoma State Cowboys bio

Living people
1998 births
American football linebackers
Oklahoma State Cowboys football players
Dallas Cowboys players
Players of American football from Knoxville, Tennessee